Nord-Aurdal is a municipality in Innlandet county, Norway. It is located in the traditional district of Valdres. The administrative centre of the municipality is the town Fagernes. Other urban centres in Nord-Aurdal include the villages of Aurdal, Leira, and Skrautvål. The municipality is served by Fagernes Airport, Leirin. In Nord-Aurdal, there is an alpine skiing center called Valdres Alpinsenter.

The  municipality is the 128th largest by area out of the 356 municipalities in Norway. Nord-Aurdal is the 152nd most populous municipality in Norway with a population of 6,354.

General information

The parish of Nordre Aurdal was established as a municipality on 1 January 1838 (see formannskapsdistrikt law). On 1 January 1894, the new Etnedal Municipality was established by merging the eastern valley area of Nordre Etnedal (population: 362) from Nordre Aurdal municipality and the Søndre Etnedal area (population: 1,331) from the neighboring municipality of Søndre Aurdal. On 1 January 1979, there was a border adjustment in an unpopulated area where part of Etnedal was transferred to Nord-Aurdal and another part of Nord-Aurdal that was transferred to Etnedal. Then on 1 January 1984, the unpopulated northern side of the Makalaus mountain was transferred from Sør-Aurdal to Nord-Aurdal.

Name
The municipality (and parish) was named after the valley in which it is located. The Old Norse form of the valley name was Aurardalr. The first element is the genitive case of an old river name Aur (now called Bøaelva) and the last element is dalr which means "valley" or "dale". The old river name is derived from aurr which means "gravel". Originally the municipality was named Nordre Aurdal. The name was changed from Nordre Aurdal to Nord-Aurdal in the early 20th century. Both nordre and nord mean "north" (more specifically, "nordre" means "northern"), so the name Nord-Aurdal means "(the) northern (part of) Aurdal". (The Church of Norway parish of Aurdal was divided into two in 1805, just over 30 years before the municipality was established in 1838.)

Coat of arms
The coat of arms was granted by royal decree on 20 December 1985. The arms show three blue flowers of the species Gentiana nivalis (or Snow Gentian) on a yellow background. The flowers, which are locally known as "the blue eyes of Christ", grow all over Norway, but they grow abundantly in this area. Three flowers were chosen to represent the three main settlements of the municipality: Aurdal, Fagernes, and Leira. This type of flower only opens in sunlight and heat, so it was chosen to symbolize being open and positive.

Churches
The Church of Norway has six parishes within the municipality of Nord-Aurdal. It is part of the Valdres prosti (deanery) in the Diocese of Hamar.

Geography

Nord-Aurdal municipality is located to the north of Sør-Aurdal Municipality, east of Etnedal Municipality and Gausdal Municipality, and south of Øystre Slidre Municipality and Vestre Slidre Municipality. To the west, it is bordered by Hemsedal Municipality and Gol Municipality in Buskerud county.

The municipality lies in the western side of Innlandet county. Although Fagernes is the administrative center of Nord-Aurdal, the village of Aurdal was the historic centre of the centuries-old Church of Norway parish of Aurdal. Nord-Aurdal is part of the traditional district of Valdres in the central part of southern Norway, situated between the valleys of Gudbrandsdal and Hallingdal.

About 50% of the land is above . The Tisleifjorden and Aurdalsfjorden are large inland lakes that are located in Nord-Aurdal. The river Begna flows through the municipality as well, with the Strondafjorden being a large lake that the river flows through.

Government
All municipalities in Norway, including Nord-Aurdal, are responsible for primary education (through 10th grade), outpatient health services, senior citizen services, unemployment and other social services, zoning, economic development, and municipal roads.  The municipality is governed by a municipal council of elected representatives, which in turn elects a mayor.  The municipality falls under the Vestre Innlandet District Court and the Eidsivating Court of Appeal.

Municipal council
The municipal council  of Nord-Aurdal is made up of 21 representatives that are elected to four year terms.  The party breakdown of the council is as follows:

Attractions
The Valdres Folkemuseum is located just outside Fagernes and has large collections of old houses, textiles, and music instruments.

Notable residents

 Knut Hamsun (1859–1952), a Norwegian author, awarded the Nobel Prize in Literature in 1920
 J. C. M. Hanson (1864–1943), an American librarian and author
 Kaare Strøm (1902–1967), a Norwegian limnologist
 Olav Meisdalshagen (1903–1959), a Norwegian politician who was Minister of Finance from 1947-1951 and Minister of Agriculture from 1955-1956
 Asbjørn Granheim (1906-1977), a Norwegian politician who was mayor of Nord-Aurdal from 1945-1971
 Inger Helene Nybråten (born 1960), a former Norwegian cross-country skier, gold medalist at the 1984 Winter Olympics and twice silver medallist at the 1992 & 1994 Winter Olympics
 Eldbjørg Hemsing (born 1990), a Norwegian classical violinist
 Guro Kleven Hagen (born 1994), a violinist, the 1st concertmaster at the Norwegian National Opera and Ballet
 Sylfest Glimsdal (born 1966), a former Norwegian biathlete who competed at three Summer Olympics

International relations

Twin towns — Sister cities
Nord-Aurdal has sister city agreements with the following places:
  - Kouvola, Etelä-Suomi, Finland
  - Lidköping, Västra Götaland County, Sweden
  - Skanderborg, Region Midtjylland, Denmark

References

External links

Municipal fact sheet from Statistics Norway 
Valdresen - The local newspaper in Nord-Aurdal.
Valdres Alpinsenter

 
Municipalities of Innlandet
Valdres
1838 establishments in Norway